Natrone Jermaine Means (born April 26, 1972) is an American former professional football player who was a running back in the National Football League (NFL) for the San Diego Chargers, Jacksonville Jaguars, and Carolina Panthers from 1993 to 2000. He was selected by the Chargers in the second round (41st overall) of the 1993 NFL Draft. In 1994, he was selected to the Pro Bowl during San Diego's Super Bowl season. He is a member of the San Diego Chargers 50th Anniversary Team. Means was nicknamed Natrone "Refried" Means and, later, "Natrone Means Business" by ESPN's Chris Berman, He is currently an assistant coach at North Carolina.

College career
Means attended the University of North Carolina at Chapel Hill and finished his career with 605 rushing attempts for 3,074 yards (5.1 yards per rushing attempt avg.), and 34 touchdowns, and hauled in 61 receptions for 500 yards (8.19 yards per rec. avg.). He rushed for more than 1,000 yards as both a sophomore and junior.

1990: 168 carries for 849 yards with 10 TD. 24 catches for 229 yards with 1 TD.
1991: 201 carries for 1,030 yards with 11 TD. 23 catches for 178 yards.
1992: 236 carries for 1,195 yards with 13 TD. 14 catches for 93 yards.

Professional career
Means played from 1993 to 1995 for the Chargers, and was a Pro Bowl selection in 1994 after leading his team to Super Bowl XXIX versus the San Francisco 49ers, only to lose 49-26. Scoring a touchdown in the Super Bowl, he broke William Perry's record for the youngest player to score a touchdown in the Super Bowl at age 22.  This was eventually broken by 21-year-old Jamal Lewis in Super Bowl XXXV. He was waived by San Diego before the 1996 season and signed with the Jaguars. Means returned to San Diego as an unrestricted free agent in 1998, but left as a free agent for the Panthers in 2000. He retired at the end of the 2000 season.

Means was named to the San Diego Chargers 50th Anniversary Team in 2009. He was a finalist in 2012 to be inducted into the Chargers Hall of Fame.

NFL career statistics
Rushing statistics

Receiving statistics

Coaching career
In 2005, Means joined the staff of Livingstone College in Salisbury, North Carolina as running backs coach and in 2006 was promoted to offensive coordinator.  He was recruited by head coach Robert Massey, who played with Means on the Jacksonville Jaguars in 1996. Means honed his coaching skills while participating in the NFL Minority Coaching Fellowship Program during the summer months of 2003 and 2006 with the Atlanta Falcons.

In 2007, Means was the offensive coordinator at the historical powerhouse West Charlotte High School in Charlotte, North Carolina. During training camp for the 2008 season, Means again participated in the NFL Minority Coaching Fellowship Program, working with the running backs of the Carolina Panthers.

In May 2014, Means became running backs coach at Winston-Salem State University. He was the associate head coach and offensive coordinator at Winston-Salem State.

In March 2021, Means became an offensive analyst at North Carolina.

References

Bibliography

External links
 North Carolina profile
 Winston-Salem State profile

1972 births
Living people
American football running backs
Carolina Panthers players
Fayetteville State Broncos football coaches
Jacksonville Jaguars players
Livingstone Blue Bears football coaches
North Carolina Tar Heels football coaches
North Carolina Tar Heels football players
San Diego Chargers players
Winston-Salem State Rams football coaches
High school football coaches in North Carolina
American Conference Pro Bowl players
People from Concord, North Carolina
People from Harrisburg, North Carolina
Players of American football from North Carolina
African-American coaches of American football
African-American players of American football
21st-century African-American sportspeople
20th-century African-American sportspeople